The speckled wood pigeon (Columba hodgsonii) is a medium-sized pigeon of the family Columbidae which lives in montane forests of Kashmir to Northeast India, eastern Tibet, central China, Yunnan and Myanmar.

Description 
The upper body of the speckled wood pigeon is maroon-brown except for its neck, which, like many pigeons, is iridescent.  Its lower body features the speckles which give it its name.  The bird is 38 centimeters in length.

References

External links
 Picture of the Speckled Wood Pigeon

speckled wood pigeon
Birds of North India
Birds of Nepal
Birds of Eastern Himalaya
Birds of Central China
Birds of Tibet
Birds of Yunnan
Birds of Myanmar
speckled wood pigeon